Violet Targuse (née Healey, 1884 – 1937) was an early female playwright in New Zealand. She has been described as "probably New Zealand's most successful and least acclaimed one-act playwright," and "the most successful writer in the early years" of the New Zealand branch of the British Drama League. Active during the 1930s when her plays were widely performed by Women's Institute drama groups, they focused on women, especially the experiences and concerns of rural women in New Zealand. Set in locations such as a freezing works, a sheep station, a shack on a railway siding, and a coastal lighthouse, her plays were seen as essentially New Zealand in setting, character, and expression. (An exception to this is Prelude, which revolves around the life of Anne Boleyn).

During the second half of the 20th century, Targuse's plays slowly disappeared from repertoires, until her work received renewed attention–initially by feminist scholars–starting since the 1990s. In 2000, both Fear and Rabbits were revived and performed at the Circa Theatre in Wellington. A version of Rabbits was translated and performed as part of the multimedia production in Vitoria-Gasteiz, Spain, and Lisbon, Portugal, in 2009.

Personal life 
Violet Healey was born in Timaru in 1884. She played first violin in the Timaru orchestra. She worked first as a nursemaid, then at the department store Ballantynes in Timaru, where she met her future husband Alfred George Targuse (1878–1944). When Alfred was transferred to Christchurch, she accompanied him and found work as a seamstress.

Alfred and Violet had two daughters, Nancy May (1910–1980) and Marjorie Joan (1912–2008). Targuse died in Christchurch in 1937.

Drama career 
Targuse authored her plays between 1930 and her death from cancer in 1937. She wrote her first play, Rabbits (1930), for a competition run by the South Canterbury Drama League, and won first prize. In 1932, her plays Fear and Touchstone won first-place-equal in the first playwriting competition held by the New Zealand branch of the British Drama League. She was also the inaugural winner of the Radio Record trophy, and a prize from the Chelsea Drama Club of Sydney.

British actress Dame Sybil Thorndike praised Fear and Touchstone as "highly dramatic, novel situations, and full of a life that must be expressed."

Plays 

 Rabbits (1930)
 Sentiment (1931)
 Fear (1933)
 Touchstone (1933)
 Volte Face (1933; unpublished)
 Beyond the Walls (1933; unpublished)
 Ebb and Flow (1934)
 Mopsey (1935)
 Men for Pieces (1935)
 The Fugitive (1935)
Passing Discord (year unknown, radio play)
 Prelude (1936)
 Auld Lang Syne (unfinished)

References 

1884 births
1937 deaths
New Zealand women dramatists and playwrights
20th-century New Zealand dramatists and playwrights
20th-century New Zealand women writers
People from Timaru